Anne Compton (born 1947) is a Canadian poet, critic, and anthologist.

Biography

Compton was born and raised in the farming community of Bangor, Prince Edward Island. She received her Bachelor of Arts from the University of Prince Edward Island, her Masters from York University and her PhD from the University of New Brunswick. Until retiring to write full-time in 2012, Dr. Compton taught literature and creative writing for the Department of Humanities and Languages at the University of New Brunswick Saint John, where she also served as Writer-in-Residence and, for many years, the Director of the Lorenzo Reading Series. She serves on the New Brunswick Arts Board.

Awards and recognition

Opening the Island
Shortlisted – Margaret and John Savage First Book Award (2002)

Won – Atlantic Poetry Prize (2003)

Processional
Won – Governor General's Award for poetry in English (2005)

Won – Atlantic Poetry Prize (2006)

Shortlisted – Pat Lowther Prize

Asking Questions Indoors and Out
Shortlisted – Atlantic Poetry Prize (2010)

Other recognition

2007 Featured writer at the Maritime Writers' Workshop & Literary Festival in Fredericton, New Brunswick.
2008 Winner – Alden Nowlan Award for excellence in English language literary arts, presented by the New Brunswick Arts Board
2008 Winner –  National Magazine Award in Poetry
2012 Winner – Queen Elizabeth II Diamond Jubilee Medal
2014 Winner – Lieutenant-Governor's Award for High Achievement in the Arts

Publications

Scholarship
A.J.M. Smith: Canadian Metaphysical (1994) 
The Edge of Home: Milton Acorn from the Island (editor, 2002)
Coastlines: The Poetry of Atlantic Canada (co-editor, 2002)
Meetings with Maritime Poets (2006)

Poetry
Opening the Island (2003)
Processional (2005)
Asking Questions Indoors and Out (2009)
Alongside (2013)

Selected anthologies
New Canadian Poetry (Fitzhenry and Whiteside, 2000)
Following the Plough: Recovering the Rural (Black Moss Press, 2000)
Landmarks: an Anthology of New Atlantic Poetry (The Acorn Press, 2001)
Modern Canadian Poets (Carcanet, 2010)

References

External links
The 2005 Governor General's Literary Awards
Anne Compton Biography
Anne Compton Wins Governor General Award in Poetry
Anne Compton: The New Brunswick Literary Encyclopedia
New Brunswick Literature Curriculum in English: Anne Compton entry and full Author Page
Anne Compton author page, Fitzhenry & Whiteside

1947 births
Living people
People from Kings County, Prince Edward Island
20th-century Canadian poets
Canadian women poets
Governor General's Award-winning poets
Writers from Prince Edward Island
20th-century Canadian women writers
21st-century Canadian women writers
University of New Brunswick alumni
Academic staff of the University of New Brunswick
21st-century Canadian poets
Women anthologists
Canadian anthologists